María de los Ángeles Becerra (born 12 February 2000) is an Argentine singer and former YouTuber. She has been dubbed as "a leading voice in Argentina's urban pop movement".

Career
Becerra began her career at twelve years of age on the platform Facebook. In 2015, she posted a five-minute-long parody monologue which was seen over one million times in just hours. This encouraged her to create a YouTube channel in which she would later post videos of her talking and singing, vlogs, and dance tutorials.

In September 2019, she released her debut EP 222 in which she fused elements of urban pop and hip hop. In November, she released her single "High", which would later gain a remix version with Argentine singer Tini and Spanish singer Lola Indigo and reached the number-two position on the Billboard Argentina Hot 100. In 2020 and 2021, Becerra was featured in multiple remixes, including "En Tu Cuerpo" with Lyanno, Rauw Alejandro and Lenny Tavárez, "AYNEA" with FMK and Beret, and "Además de Mí" with Rusherking, Khea and Duki, Lit Killah and Tiago Pzk. "Además de Mí (Remix)" became Becerra's first number-one single on the Argentina Hot 100.

In 2020, Becerra became the first Latin artist to be signed to the indie record label 300 Entertainment. In 2021, Becerra released her second EP, Animal, Pt. 1 which included the Cazzu-assisted "Animal" and the solo "Acaramelao". Both singles became hits in Argentina, where they peaked at number five and seven, respectively. The EP shifts genres between hip-hop, reggaeton, trap, hip-hop, R&B and hints of salsa, and explores the themes of women empowerment, love and lust.

Influences
According to Becerra herself, her major personal influence was her mother. As for her artistic influences, María's work is mostly influenced by Amy Winehouse, Ariana Grande, Shakira, Whitney Houston and Natti Natasha, while she has stated that she always admired Rihanna and Cardi B.

Personal life
Becerra is bisexual. In an interview for MTV News, she stated, "When I understood and accepted that I also liked girls, that was a difficult time. There was a lot of confusion and prejudice, and I had to think about how my family would take it. It was something very heavy that marked my life". Becerra is a vegan.

Stage

Discography

 Animal (2021)
 La Nena de Argentina (2022)

Tours

Headlining
 Animal Tour (2021–2022)
 La Nena de Argentina Tour (2023)

Awards and nominations

References

2000 births
21st-century Argentine women singers
21st-century Argentine LGBT people
Argentine feminists
Argentine reggaeton musicians
Argentine trap musicians
Argentine YouTubers
Argentine women rappers
Argentine women singer-songwriters
Bisexual feminists
Bisexual musicians
Bisexual women
Feminist musicians
Latin trap musicians
Argentine LGBT singers
LGBT people in Latin music
Argentine LGBT rights activists
LGBT YouTubers
Living people
People from Quilmes
Women in Latin music